Juan Gerardo Flores Ramírez (born 31 July 1968) is a Mexican politician affiliated with the PVEM. He currently serves as Senator of the LXII Legislature of the Mexican Congress. He also served as Deputy during the LXI Legislature.

References

1968 births
Living people
Members of the Senate of the Republic (Mexico)
Members of the Chamber of Deputies (Mexico)
Ecologist Green Party of Mexico politicians
21st-century Mexican politicians
Instituto Tecnológico Autónomo de México alumni
Alumni of the University of Warwick